Events from the year 1641 in art.

Events
 Claude Lorrain completes a series of twelve etchings of land- and seascapes.
 Gerard Dou and Diego Velázquez are painting.
 Peter Lely moves from Haarlem to London at about this date.

Paintings 

Claude Lorrain - The Embarkation of St. Ursula
Guercino 
The Flagellation of Christ
The Suicide of Cato
Willem Claesz. Heda – The Blackcurrant Pie
Luis de Morales - Madonna della Purità
Le Nain brothers - Venus at Vulcan's Forge
Nicolas Poussin - Time Rescuing Truth from the Assaults of Discord and Envy
Rembrandt
The Girl in a Picture Frame
The Scholar at the Lectern
The Concord of the State
Portrait of Agatha Bas
Portrait of Nicolaes van Bambeeck
Portrait of the Mennonite preacher Cornelius Claesz Anslo and his wife Aeltje Gerritsdr Schouten
Saskia as Flora
The Windmill (etching)
Andrea Sacchi - Marcantonio Pasqualini Crowned by Apollo
Sebastian Stoskopff – Great Vanity
Sir Anthony van Dyck - Self-portrait
Johannes Cornelisz Verspronck - Girl in a Blue Dress

Births
May - Johann Weikhard von Valvasor, Carniolan nobleman, scientist, writer, draughtsman, and polymath (died 1693)
May 17 - Pierre Monier, French painter (died 1703)
September 8 - Jacobus Storck, Dutch Golden Age painter (died 1700)
September 11 - Gerard de Lairesse, Dutch Golden Age painter and art theorist (died 1711)
September 22 - Titus van Rijn, son and model of Rembrandt (died 1668)
date unknown
Johann Franz Ermels, German painter and engraver (died 1693)
Juan Conchillos Falco, Spanish painter (died 1711)
Thomas Heeremans, Dutch Golden Age painter (died 1694)
Pieter Peutemans, Dutch Golden Age painter (died 1698)
Pasquale Rossi, Italian painter (died 1718)
Antoinette Bouzonnet-Stella, French engraver (died 1676)
Tao Chi, Chinese landscape painter (died 1720)
Herman Verelst, Dutch Golden Age portrait and still life painter (died 1690)
Jan Pietersz Zomer, Dutch engraver, copyist, and art collector (died 1724)

Deaths

January 11 - Juan de Jáuregui, Spanish poet and painter (born 1583)
April 16 - Domenichino (Domenico Zampieri), Italian Baroque painter (born 1581)
June 27 - Michiel Jansz van Mierevelt, Dutch painter, born at Delft (born 1567)
November - Andrés López Polanco, Spanish Baroque portrait painter (born unknown)
December 9 - Sir Anthony van Dyck, Flemish Baroque painter who became the leading court painter in England (born 1599)
date unknown
Juan Bautista de Espinosa, Spanish still life painter (born 1590)
Léonard Gaultier, French engraver (born 1561)
Lazzaro Tavarone, Genoese painter (born 1556)
Adam van Noort, Flemish painter and draughtsman (born 1561/1562)
Artus Wolffort, Flemish painter (born 1581)
probable - Ottavio Viviani, Italian painter of quadratura (born 1579)

References

 
Years of the 17th century in art
1640s in art